The Gantiadi Church or Tsandripshi Church is a 6th-century three-apse basilica, located in settlement of Gantiadi (Gagra District) in Abkhazia.

History 
Church was built in 543 AD by the Byzantine Emperor Justinian I  (527-565) when Abazg tribes has been Christianized.

Church building was altered several times in 8-10th centuries. In 1576 it was partly destroyed by Ottoman invaders. It is one of the oldest Christian temples in the Western Caucasus. Nowadays only the ruins of the basilica are left standing.

In the ruins of the Basilica was found a fragment of the tombstone with the Greek uncial inscription. It seems most likely that the inscription belonged to the tomb of a clerical or secular dignitary of Abkhazia. Name of the buried is lost. The inscription is dated back to the 6th c. The church is a three-nave basilica, built of medium-size  limestone  Quadra of regular shape and flat brick of varied sizes.

Tsandripshi church has been given the status of national importance monument.

References

Literature 
V. Jaoshvili, R. Rcheulishvili, Georgian Soviet Encyclopedia, V. 2, p. 680, Tb., 1977 year.
 Cultural Heritage in Abkhazia, Tbilisi, 2015

Churches in Abkhazia
Temples in Gagra Municipality
6th-century churches
Immovable Cultural Monuments of National Significance of Georgia